Jennifer Anne Schradie (born October 2, 1966) is an American-French digital sociologist who is an assistant professor of sociology at Observatoire sociologique du changement (OSC) at Sciences Po in Paris, France where her research and teaching focuses on digital activism, digital labor, online participation, and the digital divide. Her work has become influential in academic circles while she has also become a high-profile public commentator on digital issues. Her notable work includes the book published in 2019,The Revolution That Wasn't: How Digital Activism Favors Conservatives. Prior to her academic career, Schradie was a documentary filmmaker and community organizer.

Early life and education 
Schradie grew up in Toledo, Ohio. She attended Ottawa Hills High School from 1981–1985. She then enrolled at Duke University, where she majored in Public Policy Studies and graduated in 1989.

Activism 
As an undergraduate at Duke University, Schradie became increasingly active in political movements on campus. During her first year, she was part of a student group promoting better relations between Black and White students on campus. In 1988, she organized a campus-wide boycott of grapes in support of a United Farmworkers Union campaign against pesticides' impact on workers' health.  She also spent a semester on a study abroad program in Nicaragua at the height of the U.S.-Contra War against that country.  

Following her graduation, Schradie became medical coordinator for the North Carolina Student Rural Health Coalition from 1989 to 1994. Schradie recruited medical students from Duke, the University of North Carolina at Chapel Hill, and Easter Carolina University to staff the clinics. During this time, she also became active in the response to the 1991 Hamlet chicken processing plant fire that killed 25 workers in Hamlet, North Carolina.

In 1994, Schradie took a job at a Food Lion grocery store in Durham, North Carolina as part of effort to unionize the workforce.

Documentary films 
Schradie's background in activism led her into exploring documentary film making. In The Revolution That Wasn't, Schradie wrote: "I embraced video as a way for local people to be able to tell their stories directly, rather than through intermediaries like me...The availability of VHS video seemed to be a revolutionary way for stories about the disenfranchised to reach a wider audience." 

Schradie has produced and co-directed 6 documentaries that primarily have a social theme, including:
 Toxic Terrorism: The Shiloh Coalition Fights Back, 1990
 Organizing the South, 1992
 Fruit of Labor: Inspire the Struggle, 1995
 Housekeepers: Inconvenient Heroes, 1997

Schradie worked at the North Carolina Agency For Public Telecommunications where she both continued to develop her directing skills while also becoming active in state employees' collective bargaining issues.

In 2000, Schradie co-directed with Matt DeVries the documentary The Golf War – a story of land, golf and revolution in the Philippines. Schradie had originally gone to the Philippines with the intention of making a documentary about sweatshops, but while traveling with the guerilla New People's Army, learned that issues related to land reform were more pressing. The film followed the residents of the Filipino village Hacienda Looc as they battled the government and developers who were attempting to seize their land and turn it into a golf resort. Among the people featured in the film were Tiger Woods and his father who happened to be visiting the country to promote golf course development. The film was accepted to numerous film festivals and won 22 film festival awards.

Academic career 
In 2006, Schradie began graduate studies with a master's program at the Kennedy School at Harvard University. The following year, she started a doctoral program in Sociology at the University of California at Berkeley, where she was also affiliated with the Berkeley Center For New Media. Her research focused on the digital divide in terms of who had the means and access to create content and participate in Web 2.0 platforms such as social media and networking. Schradie named this phenomenon "digital production inequality."

Schradie mapped out many of these concepts in a journal article "The digital production gap: The digital divide and Web 2.0 collide" published in the April 2011 issue of Poetics. In the article, Schradie identified a "class-based gap among producers of online content. A critical mechanism of this inequality is control of digital tools and an elite Internet-in-practice and information habitus to use the Internet." The work presented a new aspect in debates around the digital divide and has been cited 208 times.

In 2012, the Information, Communication & Society journal published "The Trend of Class, Race, and Ethnicity in Social Media Inequality. Using survey data, Schradie found that "blogging fits into a productive framework that requires more resources" and as a result that persistent gaps exist along racial, educational, and class lines in terms of who generated blog content. The study also found that African-Americans blogged at a higher rate than whites.

Schradie began a research fellowship in 2014 at the Institute for Advanced Study in Toulouse, based at the Toulouse School of Economics in Toulouse, France for four years.  After the end of her post-doc in Toulouse, Schradie was hired by Sciences Po Paris in 2018 as an associate professor in sociology.

In France, Schradie expanded her work on digital gaps to include comparative work on the French population. With the start of the Gilets Jaunes (Yellow Vest) in 2018, she became a frequent commentator on France 24 and other media about the role of social media in starting in sustaining the movement.  Schradie cast doubt on the conventional wisdom that social networking platforms played a central role in sparking the protests. Instead, she argued that the real roots lay in real-world social and economic disparities, with social media being used as an essential tool. 

In 2018, Schradie examined how different factors drive the digital divide in online participation or digital engagement between lower and higher socio-economic groups. She discusses what she calls ASET resources: access, skills, empowerment, and tools. She asserts that lower-class individuals and organizations have less ASETs, and because of this, have less resources to participate online (such as building a robust online presence or navigating an online space). For example, her research describes that having consistent internet access was a challenge for people who can barely make ends meet. The lack of resources creates feelings of disempowerment. Schradie explains that middle to upper-class individuals not only tended to have more ASETs, but often feel more entitlement and confident in their ability to use digital media.

Schradie also discusses how social class can affect digital literacy in an article, The Great Class Wedge and the Internet's Hidden Costs.                     

With the onset of the Covid-19 pandemic, Schradie joined a group of Science Po researchers tasked with studying the social impact of Covid on French society. The research spanned several months and resulted in a series of publications drawing from data, surveys, and interviews. The work included the surprising findings, dubbed the “Eye of the Hurricane” Paradox, that while "the large majority of individuals who are not infected by the virus may be seeing their current condition in a more positive light than they normally would."

Book 
In 2011 and 2012, Schradie spent extensive time interviewing activists across the political spectrum who were involved in some way in the public employee bargaining rights. This work formed the basis of her book, The Revolution That Wasn't: How Digital Activism Favors Conservatives, by Harvard University Press in May 2019. Schradie's book argues against conventional wisdom that internet activism favors left-leaning causes such as Black Lives Matter and Occupy Wall Street. Instead, her research found that the dynamics of online activism favored right-wing voices due to factors such as class (availability of resources and training), organization (hierarchy or flat organizations), and political messaging and ideology. Taken together, these factors heavily amplified the power of right-wing voices who had built a powerful media ecosystem that spanned traditional and digital media. 

Writing in Inside Higher educations, Barbara Fister praised the book for adding "new insights to our understanding of the information landscape we live in today, one that focuses more on people than on tech. Zachary Loeb wrote that Schradie had "written an essential contribution to current conversations around not only the use of technology for political purposes, but also about the politics of technology."

On March 24, 2022, a French version of the book was published by Quanto, entitled L'illusion de la démocratie numérique: Internet est-il de droite?

Current research 
Schradie is the recipient of a grant from the McCourt Institute to examine the impact of disinformation on democratic societies.

Honors and awards 
 2012 Public Sociology Alumni Prize at UC Berkeley.
 2020 American Sociological Association’s Book Forum Selection for 2021 Annual Meeting
 2020 Charles Tilly Distinguished Contribution to Scholarship Book Award, American Sociological Association’s Section on Collective Behavior and Social Movements
 2020 Outstanding Book Award, ACSJ, International Communication Association.

See also 

 Context collapse

References 

Duke University alumni
Harvard Kennedy School alumni
University of California, Berkeley alumni
Academic staff of Sciences Po

1966 births
Living people
American sociologists
American women sociologists
French sociologists
French women sociologists
20th-century social scientists
21st-century social scientists
People from Toledo, Ohio